Ranin Salameh (born 16 August 1996) is an Israeli footballer who plays as a defender and has appeared for the Israel women's national team.

Club career

Hapoel Marmorek
Salameh joined Hapoel Marmorek ahead of the 2021–22 Ligat Nashim.

International career
Salameh has been capped for the Israel national team, appearing for the team during the 2019 FIFA Women's World Cup qualifying cycle. She made one appearance in the preliminary round, coming on as a substitute in the 65th minute of a 7–0 victory over Andorra, after Israel were already leading by 7.

Personal life
Salameh is ethnically Arab.

References

External links
 
 
 

1996 births
Living people
Israeli women's footballers
Women's association football defenders
Ligat Nashim players
Israel women's international footballers
Arab-Israeli footballers